Jibril Gaini was a Mahdism preacher who lived during the reign of Emir Zailani (1882–1888) of Gombe Empire. He was a Mahdist leader, a religious zealot who managed to establish himself at Burmi on the border between Gombe and Fika. During these periods, a wave of revolutionary Mahdism was swept through western emirates of Sokoto and eastern emirate of Gombe. Gaini managed to withstand for years against the combined forces of Gombe and neighboring emirates like Sokoto, and was finally defeated and exiled by the British Royal Niger Company in 1902.

References 

People from Northern (state)
Nigerian religious leaders